Emil Lask (25 September 1875 – 26 May 1915) was a German philosopher. A student of Heinrich Rickert at Freiburg University, he was a member of the Southwestern school of neo-Kantianism.

Biography
Lask was born in Austrian Galicia, as a son of Jewish parents. After completing his philosophical education at Freiburg, he was made lecturer at Heidelberg in 1905, and he was elected professor there just before the outbreak of World War I. When war began in 1914 Lask immediately volunteered. Since, as a Heidelberg professor, he would have been regarded as indispensable on the home front, he did not have to enlist. But, conscientious and idealistic, Lask believed that he had an obligation to serve his country. Lask was made a sergeant and sent to Galicia on the Eastern front, despite a frail constitution and severe myopia—which also meant that he could not shoot, but he still felt obliged to remain at the front. Lask died during the war, not far from the city of his birth, in the Galician Campaign. Wilhelm Windelband refused to request his return to Heidelberg as indispensable to philosophy.

Lask was an important and original thinker whose rewarding work is little known, due to his early death, but also because of the decline of neo-Kantianism. His published and some unpublished writings were collected in a three volume edition by his pupil Eugen Herrigel with a notice by Lask's former teacher Rickert in 1923 and 1924. Lask is of interest to philosophers because of his uncompromising attitude and to historians of philosophy because of his influence on György Lukács and the young Martin Heidegger. In Being and Time (1927), Heidegger credited Lask with being the only person to have taken up Edmund Husserl's investigations "positively from outside the main stream of phenomenological research", pointing to Husserl's Logical Investigations (1900–1901) as an influence on Lask's Die Logik der Philosophie und die Kategorienlehre (1911) and Die Lehre vom Urteil (1912). Lask's ideas were also influential in Japan, due to Herrigel, who lived and taught there for several years.

His sister was the poet Berta Lask.

Works
 Fichtes Idealismus und die Geschichte Tübingen, 1902.
 Rechtsphilosophie in: Die Philosophie im Beginn des 20. Jahrhunderts. Festschrift für Kuno Fischer edited by Wilhelm Windelband, Heidelberg, 1907.
 Die Logik der Philosophie und die Kategorienlehre Tübingen, J.C.B. Mohr, 1911.
 Gesammelte Schriften edited by Eugen Herrigel, Tübingen: Mohr, 1923-24 (3 volumes); reprint: Jena, Scheglmann, 2002.

English translations
 Legal Philosophy in The Legal Philosophies of Lask, Radbruch, and Dabin translated by Kurt Wilk (Cambridge, Mass.; Harvard U.P., 1950; 20th Century Legal Philosophy series, vol. IV), pp. 1–42.
 The Logic of Philosophy and the Doctrine of Categories translated by Christian Braun, Free Association Books, 1999.

French translations
 La logique de la philosophie et la doctrine des catégories. Etude sur la forme logique et sa souveraineté Paris, Vrin, 2002.

Notes

References
 Beiser, Frederick, The German Historicist Tradition (Oxford: Oxford University Press, 2011) [contains a chapter long introduction and overview of Lask's work]
 Borda, Mara, Knowledge Science Religion: Philosophy as a Critical Alternative to Metaphysics (Würzburg: Konighausen & Neumann, 2006) [contains very extensive discussion of Lask with comparisons to Simmel and Heidegger]

External links
 Jewish Virtual Library Article on Lask
 "Emil Lask and Kantianism" by Frederick Beiser
 "Two Idealisms: Lask and Husserl" by Karl Schuhmann and Barry Smith, Kant-Studien, 83 (1993), 448–466.
 “Neo-Kantianism and Phenomenology: The Case of Emil Lask and Johannes Daubert”, by Karl Schuhmann and Barry Smith, Kant-Studien, 82 (1991), 303–318.
 http://giuseppecapograssi.wordpress.com/2012/10/12/daniele-petrella-la-silenziosa-esplosione-del-neokantismo-emil-lask-e-la-mediazione-della-fenomenologia-di-husserl/

1875 births
1915 deaths
University of Freiburg alumni
Academic staff of Heidelberg University
Kantian philosophers
20th-century German philosophers
German military personnel killed in World War I
German Jewish military personnel of World War I
Jewish philosophers